Live from the Dark is a DVD released by the Swedish hard rock band Europe. The main feature is a concert filmed at the Hammersmith Apollo in London, England  on November 15, 2004.

A bonus disc with extra material is included, and there is a Special Edition version of this DVD which also contains the CD Start from the Dark.

Track listing - Disc 1
 "Got to Have Faith" 
 "Ready or Not" 
 "Superstitious" 
 "America" 
 "Wings of Tomorrow" 
 "Let the Good Times Rock"
 "Animal Crossing" [keyboard solo] / "Seven Doors Hotel"
 "Hero" 
 "Wake Up Call" 
 "Sign of the Times"
 "Milano" [guitar solo] / "Girl from Lebanon"
 "Carrie" [acoustic version]
 "Flames" 
 "Yesterday's News" [printed as "Yesterdaze News"]
 "Rock the Night" 
 "Start from the Dark"
 "Cherokee" 
 "The Final Countdown"

Bonus Features - Disc 2
Behind the Tour: Documentary about the tour.
Taxi Diaries: Interviews with all the band members.
On-stage Interviews: Interviews with the musicians about their instruments and equipment.
From the Soundcheck: "Spirit of the Underdog" and "Heart of Stone". 
Music Videos: "Got to Have Faith" and "Hero".
Miscellaneous: Biography, discography and videography.

Personnel
Joey Tempest – lead vocals, rhythm & acoustic guitars
John Norum – lead & rhythm guitars, backing vocals
John Levén – bass guitar
Mic Michaeli – keyboards, backing vocals
Ian Haugland – drums, backing vocals

Europe (band) video albums
Albums recorded at the Hammersmith Apollo
2000s English-language films